Amasya Province is a province of Turkey, situated on the Yeşil River in the Black Sea Region to the north of the country.

The provincial capital is Amasya, the antique Amaseia mentioned in documents from the era of Alexander the Great and the birthplace of the geographer and historian Strabo. In Ottoman times Amasya was well known for its madrassas, especially as a centre for the Khalwati Sufi order. The district is also home to the Ottoman Turkish leader Kara Mustafa Pasha.

Demographics

Geography
Amasya, between the Black Sea and inner Anatolia, lies at the centre of a region of fertile plains crossed by the Yeşilırmak, Çekerek, and Tersakan rivers. Despite being near the Black Sea, Amasya has hot summers and moderately cold winters. Amasya is an agricultural province known as the best apple growing province in the country, and also producing tobacco, peaches, cherries and okra.

Districts

Amasya province is divided into 7 districts (capital district in bold):
 Amasya
 Göynücek
 Gümüşhacıköy
 Hamamözü
 Merzifon
 Suluova
 Taşova

References

External links 
  Pictures of the city of Amasya
  Amasya Weather Forecast Information
  Amasya VR Photography